Hohhot Black Horse (呼和浩特黑马) is a defunct Chinese football club based in Hohhot, China and were based at the Hohhot People's Stadium.

Founded as Beijing Zangying Xuequan, a team based in Beijing but dedicated to unearthing and developing Tibetan football talents, and later renamed as Xizang Huitong Luhua, the team played in the Yi League until 2005, when they purchased Dalian Changbo from the upper Jia League in 2006. The newly merged team was moved to Taiyuan, Shanxi and renamed to Shanxi Wosen Luhu, but relocated again to Hohhot, Inner Mongolia in 2007 and renamed themselves Hohhot Black Horse, then withdrew mid-season and dissolved.

In November 2009, the former club general manager Wang Pu and deputy general manager Wang Xin were arrested and later convicted, becoming the first case in the 2009 "Chinese football anti-betting storm".

Name history

2002–03: Beijing Zangying Xuequan (北京藏鹰雪泉)
2004–05: Xizang Huitong Luhua (西藏惠通陆华)
2006: Shanxi Wosen Luhu (山西沃森路虎)
2007: Hohhot Black Horse (呼和浩特黑马)

Results
As of the end of 2007 season

All-time league Ranking

 In group stage.
 In North Group.

References

External links
Tibet football hopeful to home in Taiyuan

Defunct football clubs in China
Football clubs in China
Association football clubs established in 2002
Association football clubs disestablished in 2007
2002 establishments in China
2007 disestablishments in China